Downe, formerly Down, is a village in Greater London, England, located within the London Borough of Bromley but beyond the London urban sprawl. Downe lies on a hill, and much of the centre of the village is unchanged; the former village school now acts as the village hall. The word Downe originates from the Anglosaxon word dūn, latterly down, hence the South and North Downs. In April 1965, it (and the remaining part of Orpington Urban District Council), which was abolished, were transferred from the historic county of Kent and placed within the newly created London Borough of Bromley.

Partial History

Lord Simon de Manning, a former Lord of the Manor for Kevington, London, and holder of the land which now includes Downe, was a Grandson of Rudolph de Manning, Count Palatine, (who married Elgida, aunt to King Harold I, of England); he was the royal Standard Bearer to King Richard the Lionheart, who carried the royal Standard to Jerusalem in 1190, during the First Crusade. In England, the forms Earl Palatine and Palatine Earldom are preferred.
As well as Downe, (formerly 'Down'), the Manning's Kevington Manor included the areas which later became Berry's Green, Luxted, Single Street, Westerham Hill, and Leaves Green, which form, collectively, (excluding Kelvington), the Darwin (ward), Greater London's largest electoral Ward.

When Charles Darwin moved there in 1842, the village was still known as Down. Its name was changed later in the 1940s to Downe, to avoid confusion with County Down in Ireland.

Darwin
Charles Darwin lived in Down House for 40 years, from 1842 until he died there in 1882. He became a close friend of Sir John Lubbock, 3rd Baronet, who lived nearby at the Lubbock's High Elms estate on the other side of the village. A favourite place of Darwin's was Downe Bank, now a nature reserve and Site of Special Scientific Interest, and several members of his family are buried in the graveyard of St Mary's Church.

Down House and the surrounding area has been nominated by the Department of Culture, Media and Sport to become a World Heritage Site.  However, this decision has been deferred.

Local politics

Since 2019, the local Member of Parliament has been Gareth Bacon of the Conservative Party. By a numerical majority of 19,453 votes (38.5%), Orpington is the safest Conservative Parliamentary seat in London.

One councillor is elected every four years to Bromley London Borough Council. To date, the Darwin ward has only been represented by representatives from the Conservative Party.
It is the largest Greater London Ward, and includes Berry's Green, Single Street, Luxted, Leaves Green, and Cudham.

Buckston Browne Farm

Downe is the location of Buckston Browne Farm, built in 1931 as a surgical research centre by the Royal College of Surgeons (RCS). In the 1980s, the farm caused controversy because of its use of vivisection techniques, and in August 1984 it was raided by anti-vivisection activists.

The farm has now been made into four houses.

Scouting
There are two scout campsites in the Downe area:

 The Greenwich (one of the Districts of the Greater London South Scout county) District campsite is also nearby.

Transport

Downe, being in the county of Greater London, is still under Transport for London remit despite being outside the metropolis. It is served by several London Buses bus services from London but overall has limited connections into London. There are no rail links to the village (nearest stations: Orpington, Bromley and Hayes), but it is served by two hourly bus routes:

146 - Bromley North to Downe via Old Hayes and Keston;

R8 – Biggin Hill to Orpington via Downe and Green Street Green;

Notable people

Bill Hunter Christie (1922-1997), lobbyist for the Falkland Islanders
Charles Darwin (1809–82), biologist, naturalist and geologist
Horace Darwin (1851–1928), civil engineer and Fellow of Trinity College, Cambridge
 Nigel Farage (born 1964), former leader of UKIP and Member of European Parliament for South East England. 
Charles Hayes (1678–1760), mathematician and chronologist
John Lubbock (1803–65), banker, barrister, mathematician and astronomer
John Lubbock (1834–1913), banker, biologist, archaeologist and Liberal politician
Mark Lubbock (1898–1986), conductor and composer of operetta and light music
Herbert Newton Casson (1869–1951), journalist and author, founder of Efficiency magazine
Olive Willis (1877–1964), founder of Downe House School

Nearest places
Cudham
Berry's Green
Luxted
Single Street
Farnborough
Keston
Orpington

References

External links

Audio tour of Downe and Down House
Downe Bank Nature Reserve
Darwin at Downe - World Heritage Site nomination
Homepage of Stage Door Theatre Group, Downe

Areas of London
Districts of the London Borough of Bromley
Villages in the London Borough of Bromley
Former civil parishes in the London Borough of Bromley